Cape Race is a point of land located at the southeastern tip of the Avalon Peninsula on the island of Newfoundland, in Newfoundland and Labrador, Canada. Its name is thought to come from the original Portuguese name for this cape, "Raso", meaning flat or low-lying.  The Cape appeared on early sixteenth century maps as Cabo Raso and its name may derive from a cape of the same name at the mouth of the Tagus River in Portugal.  The cape was the location of the Cape Race LORAN-C transmitter until the system was decommissioned in 2010. It is also home to the Cape Race Lighthouse, notable for having received the distress call from the RMS Titanic.

Geography
Dense fog, rocky coasts, and its proximity to trans-Atlantic shipping routes have resulted in many shipwrecks near Cape Race over the years. On average it is shrouded in fog on 158 days of the year.

Climate

History

In 1583, having claimed the port of St John's for Queen Elizabeth I, Sir Humphrey Gilbert, on board the ship Squirrel, and accompanied by the ships Golden Hind and Delight, passed by Cape Race on his way back to England. Squirrel would sink en route, taking Gilbert with her.
From 1859 to 1866, the New York City Associated Press kept a newsboat at Cape Race to meet ocean liners passing by on their way from Europe so that news could be telegraphed to New York.  These news items carried the byline "via Cape Race".
In 1904, the first wireless station in Newfoundland was built at Cape Race. On the night Titanic sank, wireless operator Jack Phillips was sending telegraphs to Cape Race for relay to New York City.  When Cyril Evans, wireless operator of the Leyland Line SS Californian, sent an iceberg warning to the RMS Titanic, only a few miles away, Phillips was so annoyed with the loud signal (due to the proximity) and responded "Keep out, Shut up, I'm working Cape Race," meaning that he was transmitting to the Cape Race Marconi Station.  This would become a famous incident, as the bored and angry Evans soon switched off the wireless and went to sleep, and Titanic hit an iceberg only fifteen minutes later. After Titanic's distress call, Cape Race played a major role in relaying news of the sinking to other ships and land locations.

Marconi's station (MCE) was rebuilt on the same site and opened as a "wireless interpretation centre" to commemorate the 100th anniversary of Titanics sinking in 2012.

References

http://commons.wikimedia.org/wiki/File:Amerika14April1912.JPG

External links

 Cape Race Wireless log at sinking of Titanic preserved at the Maritime Museum of the Atlantic, Halifax

Race